Bruxanelia is a monotypic genus of flowering plants in the family Rubiaceae. The genus contains only one species, viz. Bruxanelia indica, which is endemic to southern India.

References

External links 
 Bruxanelia in the World Checklist of Rubiaceae

Monotypic Rubiaceae genera
Enigmatic Rubiaceae taxa